Chevalier Charles-Marie de Trolong du Rumain (30 September 1743 – 10 August 1780) was a French naval officer of the Ancien Régime.

Career 
He took part in the War of American Independence, notably commanding the 10-gun cutter Curieuse which, along with Iphigénie, captured HMS Lively on 10 July 1778.

The next year, he directed the Capture of Saint Vincent and became colonial governor of the island.

In September 1779, he took part in the Siege of Savannah, captaining the 32-gun Chimère.

In 1780, he was in command of the frigate Nymphe.

Citations and references 
Citations

References
 
  (1671-1870)
 

External links
 

French Navy officers
1743 births
1780 deaths
French military personnel killed in the American Revolutionary War